Pieces of a Man is the second studio album by American rapper Mick Jenkins, released on October 26, 2018, via Free Nation/Cinematic Music Group.

Background
The album's production came from multiple contributors such as THEMpeople, Black Milk, Dee Lilly, BadBadNotGood, Kaytranada, OV, Ben Hixon, STLNDRMS, Nez & Rio, and Ahwlee, among others. The album features guest appearances from Ghostface Killah, Julien Bell, Michael Anthony, Ben Hixon and Corinne Bailey Rae. Pieces of a Man also prominently pays homage to Gil Scott-Heron's 1971 debut studio album, Pieces of a Man.

Singles
The album's release was preceded by two promotional singles: "Bruce Banner" and "What Am I To Do" on August 6 and 26, respectively. The album's first single, "Understood" was released on October 12, 2018, preceded its visuals the day before. The second single "Padded Locks" featuring veteran Wu-Tang Clan member Ghostface Killah was released on October 21, 2018.

Critical reception
Trey Alston of Highsnobiety gave the album four-and-a-half stars out of five, saying, “Pieces of A Man is at its strongest when it goes full in on that mesmerizingly simple urbane aesthetic, with Jenkins riding the wave with a relaxed nod and making good on his promise to deliver the most authentic experience possible.”

Track listing
Credits adapted from Bandcamp and Tidal.

References

2018 albums
Mick Jenkins (rapper) albums
Cinematic Music Group albums
Albums produced by Black Milk
Albums produced by Kaytranada